Swedish passports are issued to nationals of Sweden for the purpose of international travel. Besides serving as proof of Swedish citizenship, they facilitate the process of securing assistance from Swedish consular officials abroad (or other EU or Nordic missions if a Swedish embassy or consulate is not available).

Swedish passports are issued by the Swedish Police and applications are made at police stations equipped with a passport terminal for taking photographs and fingerprints. Passports issued since 1 October 2005 are biometric, and valid for five years. Earlier passports were valid for ten years (adults) or five years (children).

It is possible for a Swedish citizen to hold two valid passports at the same time if it is needed for work or other special reasons for as long as the necessity applies, but not longer than the ordinary passport is valid for. This can be useful when travelling to states which reject a passport with an entry stamp or visa of another state in it (Israel vs several Arab states). It can also be used when the ordinary passport is held by another country's embassy for processing a visa application.

In 2013, Swedish passports were reported to be among the most frequently traded passports on the black market. The reason cited was that there was no limit on the number of replacement passports a holder could request. This prompted calls for legislation to limit the number of times replacement passports could be issued per individual. On 15 April 2016 a new law was enacted so that no more than three passports could be issued to the same person within a five-year period.

Every Swedish citizen is also a citizen of the European Union and the passport, along with the national identity card allows for freedom of movement in any of the states of the European Economic Area and Switzerland. For travel within the Nordic countries, the Nordic Passport Union allows Nordic citizens to move freely without requiring identity documentation.

Physical appearance and data contained

The Swedish passport has the standard biometric symbol emblazoned below the coat of arms and uses the standard European Union design.

Identity information page
The Swedish Passport includes the following printed data:

 Photo of Passport Holder
 Type (P)
 Code (SWE)
 Passport No.
 1 Surname
 2 Given Names
 3 Nationality (SVENSK SWEDISH)
 3a. Personal Id. No.
 4 Date of Birth
 4a. Height
 5 Sex
 6 Date of Issue
 7 Date of Expiry
 8 Place of Birth
 9 Authority
 10 Holder's Signature

The information page ends with the Machine Readable Zone starting with P<SWE. In addition to this, the passport also has printed safeguards to make it easier to visually detect forgery attempts.

Different spellings of the same name
The name in the non-machine-readable zone is spelled as in the national population register, i.e. transliterated to Latin script if required. In the machine-readable zone, letters outside the A–Z range like å, ä or ö are mapped to digraphs, å becoming AA, ä becoming AE, and ö becoming OE. For example: Fältskog → FAELTSKOG. Letters with accents are replaced by simple letters (for example, é → E).

Chip data
The current series of passports contain an RFID chip with 16 data groups (DGs).
 DG1 – MRZ, mandatory
 DG2 – Face, mandatory 
 DG3 – Finger, optional (Mandatory for EU Schengen and EU MS)
 DG4 – Iris, optional
 —
 DG14 – SecurityInfo, optional
 DG15 – Active authentication public key, optional
 SO – Security object, mandatory

The security object contains signed hash values of all data groups. Correctly verifying this SOD with its PKI certificate hierarchy will tell that the passport is authentic and issued by the correct and valid issuer. Even the public available data (DG1, DG2, DG14, DG15, SO) in the chip requires decryption with a key printed in the machine-readable zone, which aims to prevent the chip from being read without the user's consent. Sweden started capturing and storing fingerprint data for new passport applications on 28 June 2009, as required by the European Union.

Languages
The data page/information page is printed in Swedish and English, with translation in other official languages of the European Union elsewhere in the document. The page containing the guide to check the security features of the data page is printed only in English.

Identification requirements
Application is done at passport offices (located in police stations) or embassies. The applicant must show up in person, and will have the photo taken there. When doing the application identification of the applicant is needed. This is done by:
Showing a valid Swedish passport (not temporary), Swedish national identity card, Swedish driving licence, Swedish tax office id card, or an id card following the SIS standard.
A person not possessing any of these identity documents must bring a person who vouches for the identity, is at least 18 years old, has one of the above documents, and is one of:
Husband, wife, someone living at the same address, parent, grandparent, own child, sibling, adopted parent or equivalent, employer since at least one year, or an official at an authority who knows the person through their work.
These requirements are similar to the procedure for other Swedish identity documents. There is no age limit to get a passport, but people below 18 must be accompanied by their guardian (preferably both) at application.

Visa free travel

Visa requirements for Swedish citizens are administrative entry restrictions by the authorities of other states placed on citizens of Sweden. As of 21 September 2022, Swedish citizens had visa-free or visa on arrival access to 188 countries and territories, ranking the Swedish passport 5th in the world in terms of travel freedom (tied with Austria, Denmark, and the Netherlands) according to the Henley Passport Index.

The Swedish national identity card can be used for travelling to and staying in European countries (except Belarus, Russia, Ukraine and United Kingdom). It can also be used instead of a Swedish passport for entering Dominica (de facto), French overseas territories, Georgia, Montserrat (if in transit to a third country for max 14 days) and on package holidays to Tunisia. However, direct outbound travel from Sweden to non-EU/Schengen territories is not permitted by Swedish border police.

As a member state of the European Union, Swedish citizens enjoy freedom of movement within the European Economic Area (EEA). The Citizens’ Rights Directive defines the right of free movement for citizens of the EEA. Through bilateral agreements freedom of movement is extended to Switzerland, and all EU and EFTA nationals are not only visa-exempt but are legally entitled to enter and reside in each other's countries.

Abuse and black market trade of Swedish passports 
Before 2016, Sweden had no limit on the number of times an individual may claim to have lost a passport and have a new one re-issued. That led to Swedish passports being sold on the black market and used by people smugglers. This prompted calls for legislation to limit the number of times replacement passports could be issued to each citizen. On 15 April 2016 a new law was enacted limiting holders to a maximum of three passports issued within a five-year period.

Forgeries 
In 2020 Swedish police reported 450 forged passports, nearly twice the number from the previous year, included in that number were also instances where a genuine passport was used by another individual of similar appearance. These were part of a black market where passports are bought, rented or borrowed for journeys to and from Sweden. Recorded instances included asylum seekers, people using the forged passports for criminal or any combination of the two.

Historic images

See also
 Visa requirements for Swedish citizens
 Visa policy of the Schengen Area
 Passports of the European Union
 Swedish nationality law
 Identity documents in Sweden

References

External links
 Swedish passport info  from PRADO

Passports by country
Passport
European Union passports